Saw Yun was the only son of King Saw Lu of Pagan, and the father of King Sithu I. He was married to Princess Shwe Einthi, daughter of King Kyansittha.

References

Bibliography
 

Pagan dynasty
11th-century Burmese people